Beautiful Dreamer is a fictional character appearing in American comic books published by Marvel Comics. Created by Louise Simonson and June Brigman, the character made her first appearance in Power Pack #12 (July 1985). She belongs to the subspecies of humans called mutants, who are born with superhuman abilities. 

Dreamer appeared in the first season of The Gifted played by Elena Satine.

Publication history
Beautiful Dreamer's first appearance was in Power Pack #12 (July 1985), and she was created by Louise Simonson and June Brigman.

Fictional character biography 
Beautiful Dreamer's real name and past prior to joining the Morlocks are unknown. She followed the terrorist Morlock leader Masque for a time, and committed criminal acts by manipulating others with her mental powers at his behest. However, Beautiful Dreamer's primary motivation for doing so, as with most of her fellow Morlocks, is presumed to be her desire for company and community.

Dreamer, along with several other Morlocks, confronts the Power Pack, when the young team enters the New York City sewers to look for their lost school books. The empathic Annalee, mourning her deceased children, wishes to have Beautiful Dreamer alter the memories of Power Pack. The goal is to have the Power Pack believe Annalee is their mother. Two of the X-Men, Nightcrawler and Kitty Pryde, stop this plan.

When the Morlock leader Callisto had left for a time, Masque decides to re-implement Annalee's desires. The Power Pack's parents have their memories altered and ultimately, three of the Pack. The last member, Energizer, summons help from the X-Men. Callisto returns in time to undo the plan and Beautiful Dreamer restores the minds of all affected.

Beautiful Dreamer was among the few members of the Morlocks to survive the Marauders' "Mutant Massacre", during which most members of her community were killed. She stays with X-Factor, for a while, along with her friends, Tar Baby, Ape, and Erg.

There was a brief conflict with another group of Morlocks, as all of them do not get along. Dreamer's group eventually returns to the sewers in an attempt to create a new life for themselves.

Beautiful Dreamer is one of the 198 mutants who retained their powers after the events of M-Day.

Beautiful Dreamer was one of the mutants who heard Cyclops's psychic call to come to San Francisco and was going there, but she was captured by Bastion's Purifiers and injected with the Legacy Virus. She was delivered by the Leper Queen to a Friends of Humanity anti-mutant rally held in Iowa, where the virus activated her powers to the extreme, killing all of the people attending the rally. She eventually died as well because of the virus.

Powers and abilities
Beautiful Dreamer possesses the ability to psionically alter the memories of others using her special "dream smoke" to implant false recollections.

In other media

A character based on Beautiful Dreamer named Sonia Simonson / Dreamer appears in The Gifted, portrayed by Elena Satine. This version is in a relationship with John Proudstar before she is later murdered by Roderick Campbell.

References

External links

Characters created by Louise Simonson
Comics characters introduced in 1985
Marvel Comics characters who have mental powers
Marvel Comics female characters
Marvel Comics mutants
X-Men supporting characters